Beltona Records is a British record label founded in 1923, producing recordings 'of a mainly Scottish interest'. The company's early history began with 78rpm gramophone records of traditional Scottish music. They produced music common of the time, i.e. dance and barn music. Typical instrumentation included Hohner harmonicas, pianos and violins. Beltona Records is now a subsidiary of Decca Records.

The CLPGS publish a history of the label and a list of known titles in their Reference Series of books.

See also
List of record labels
Jimmy Shand

References

External links
 Beltona Record Company - Buy Music Online

British record labels